Ralph Allon Smith (born December 1, 1938 in Brookhaven, Mississippi) is a former American football tight end in the National Football League. He played eight seasons for the Philadelphia Eagles (1962–1964), the Cleveland Browns (1965–1968), and the Atlanta Falcons (1969). He was drafted out of the University of Mississippi by the Philadelphia Eagles in the 1962 NFL Draft.

1938 births
Living people
People from Brookhaven, Mississippi
Players of American football from Mississippi
American football tight ends
Ole Miss Rebels football players
Philadelphia Eagles players
Cleveland Browns players
Atlanta Falcons players